Miss Colombia 2007, the 73rd Miss Colombia pageant, was held in Cartagena de Indias, Colombia, on November 12, 2007. The pageant was broadcast live on RCN TV from the Centro de Convenciones Cartagena de Indias in Cartagena de Indias, Colombia. At the conclusion of the final night of competition, outgoing titleholder Miss Colombia 2006 Eileen Roca Torralvo crowned Taliana Vargas of Magdalena as the new Miss Colombia. Vargas would later placed virreina at the 2008 Miss Universe Pageant.

Results

Special awards
 Miss Photogenic (voted by press reporters) - Gloria Patricia Pérez  (Sucre)
 Best Body Figura Bodytech- Maria Cristina Diaz-Granados (Bogotá)
 Miss Elegance - Taliana Vargas (Magdalena)
 Best Face - Taliana Vargas (Magdalena)
 Reina de la policia - Taliana Vargas (Magdalena)
 Señorita Puntualidad - Marieta Luz Juan Guardela  (Bolívar)
 Best Regional Costume - María Antonia Moncada Cortés (Antioquia)
 Miss Congeniality - Carolina Gulfo Guerra (Córdoba)
 Zapatilla Real - Priscilla Mendoza Méndez (Guajira)

Delegates

The Miss Colombia 2007 delegates are:

Amazonas - María Alejandra Vallejo Londoño
Antioquia - María Antonia Moncada Cortés
Atlántico - Cristina Lucía Camargo de la Rans
Bogotá - María Cristina Díaz Granados Dangond 
Bolívar - Marieta Luz Juan Guardela
Caldas - Valentina Uribe Llano
Cartagena DT y C - Negaira Inés Roa Olier
Chocó - Cinthia Yarleidy Caicedo Perea
Córdoba - Carolina Gulfo Guerra 
Cúcuta - Sarah Juliana Monsalve Roldán
Cundinamarca - Emma Carolina Cruz Contento 
Guajira - Priscilla Mendoza Méndez
Huila - Silvana Delgado Vargas 
Magdalena - Taliana María Vargas Carrillo
Meta - Jennifer Kristin Arias Falla
Nariño - María Cristina Barbato Gaviria
Norte de Santander - María Alejandra Ramírez García
Quindío - Anyela Paola Herrera Sánchez
Risaralda - María Fernanda Trejos Morales
San Andrés Y Providencia - Melinda Melandra Escalona Henry
Santander - Yuli Tatiana Bautista Rodríguez
Sucre - Gloria Patricia Pérez Peñuela 
Tolima - Juliana Andrea Caballero Castaño
Valle - Catalina Giraldo Flórez

References and footnotes

External links
Official site

Miss Colombia
2007 in Colombia
2007 beauty pageants